The 2014 Winter Paralympics, officially the XI Paralympic Winter Games, or the 11th Winter Paralympics, were held from 7 to 16 March 2014 in Sochi, Russia. 72 events in 5 winter sport disciplines were contested.

Alpine skiing

Women's events

Men's events

Biathlon

Women's events

Men's events

Cross-country skiing

Women's events

Men's events

Relay events

Curling

Ice sledge hockey

See also
 2014 Winter Paralympics medal table

References

medal winners
Lists of Paralympic medalists
Winter Paralympics medalists
Russia sport-related lists